Maulana Abdur Rahman was member of the 2nd Lok Sabha. He represented the Jammu constituency of Jammu and Kashmir and was a member of the Congress (I) political party. He was in office from April 1957 to March 1962.

Posts held

See also
2nd Lok Sabha
Lok Sabha
List of members of the 15th Lok Sabha of India

References 

India MPs 1957–1962
People from Jammu
Lok Sabha members from Jammu and Kashmir
Year of birth missing
Possibly living people